Ghadana of Armenia (fl. 135) was queen consort of Iberia by marriage to Pharasmanes II, and regent during the minority of her grandson Pharasmanes III in 135.

She was an Armenian princess and daughter of King Vologases I. Through her marriage to Pharasmanes II, she became Queen of Caucasian Iberia.

After his death, their son Ghadam ruled for three years. In 135, Ghadam was succeeded by his one-year-old son Pharasmanes III. Ghadana then acted as regent for her grandson because of his youth.

References

2nd-century women rulers
Armenian princesses
Queens consort from Georgia (country)
Arsacid dynasty of Iberia
2nd-century Iranian people
Regents of Georgia